Staveley may refer to:

Places
 Staveley, Cumbria, village in the former county of Westmorland and now in Cumbria, England
 Staveley railway station
 Staveley-in-Cartmel, village formerly in Lancashire, now in Cumbria, England
 Staveley, Derbyshire, England
 Staveley, New Zealand, a locality in the Ashburton District
 Staveley, North Yorkshire, England

People with the surname
 Staveley (surname)

Other uses
 Staveley F.C., a football club based in Staveley, Derbyshire in the 1880s and 1890s
 Staveley (horse) (fl. 1802–1807), a British Thoroughbred racehorse

See also
 Staveley Street Hong Kong
 Stavely, town in Alberta, Canada